James Verner (1 March 1746 - 1822) was an MP in the Parliament of Ireland from County Antrim, Kingdom of Ireland. He was father to Sir William Verner, 1st Baronet. He and his sons played an instrumental role in the Battle of the Diamond near their home.

Early life
James was the son of Henry Verner, Esquire and Anne Kerr. His siblings included David, Thomas, Mary and Anne. The Verner's descended from the Scotch Verners of Auchendinny (also spelled Auchentennie). In Scotland, they had property until 1650 near Edinburgh at Auchendinny starting in the 15th century and they spelled their name "Vernour". Prior to that, they are believed to have been Norman; Their surname was spelled "le Venour" and first appeared in England in the 13th century.

Henry and Anne had three sons and three daughters. James' siblings were Thomas, David, Mary and Anne. It is through childless Thomas that James' son William inherited the Churchill estate.

Battle of the Diamond
In 1795, James Verner made himself known for his actions:

Public service
Verner was a sheriff for the Armagh, Dublin, Meath, Monaghan and Tyrone counties.

For many years he was a member of the Irish parliament, beginning in 1794 when he represented the borough of Dungannon in County Tyrone. He accepted the position in John Knox's place when Knox took the position of escheator of Munster (i.e. resigned). In Dublin, he had a home at Dawson Street until 1801 and the Act of Union in 1801 (creation of the United Kingdom of Great Britain and Ireland).

Personal life
He married Jane Clarke, daughter of Rev. Henry Clarke of Anasammery, Armagh and his wife, the daughter of John Atkinson, of Money. Their children included Thomas, James, David, John, Sir William Verner, 1st Baronet, and Elizabeth. In 1788, 5-year-old son William received the estate at Churchill (also Church Hill), Verner's Bridge in the County Armagh from his uncle Thomas Verner who had no children. James and Jane moved into the home with their family and were guardians of the residence until 1807.

Set the foundation stone on 28 August 1816 for the Tartaraghan St. Paul's Church.

James died in 1822 and Jane in 1827. Both are buried at Loughgall.

See also
 Armagh disturbances
 Drumcree Church

Notes

References

1746 births
1822 deaths
Politicians from County Armagh
Irish MPs 1790–1797
Irish MPs 1798–1800
Members of the Parliament of Ireland (pre-1801) for County Tyrone constituencies